Rush is a Screamin' Swing ride at Thorpe Park in Chertsey, Surrey which opened at the park alongside another S&S – Sansei Technologies thrill ride, Slammer, in 2005. At the time of its opening, it was the tallest ride of its type in the world. Many consider it to be one of the best flat rides in the UK.

Construction 
Construction for Rush started late 2004, after Eclipse, a Ferris wheel, was removed. It was originally meant to have four air tanks, instead of two. It took around 4 months to construct and test. The ride was installed by Ride Entertainment Group.

Ride Opening 
The grand opening for Rush was at midday on 27 May 2005. After testing all through the morning, it opened, only to break down after four ride cycles. It was tested for over an hour, and reopened again. As the ride has two swings which swing in opposite directions, .

Ride Experience 
The ride begins with low swings which gradually get higher. The approximate angle the swings reach is 104 degrees. At the peak of the swing, riders feel strong negative G's and at the bottom, positive forces of up to 3.5 G. After four swings at its full height, the ride slows down quickly to a stop.

The ride experience is enhanced by the fact that it has a lap bar instead of the over the shoulder restraints. This gives riders more freedom and feel more exposed. The ride is powered by compressed air which makes the ride extremely loud. Some guests feel the noise adds to the experience but it has been criticised due to the noise as well.

The ride can also run on one swing if the park is quiet or if the other is not working.

The capacity with one swing is 375 riders per hour, with two swings 768 riders per hour.

2008 Incident 
On 27 May 2008, a piece of metal fell from the ride, while it was operating with guests seated. The ride was stopped immediately and was closed for inspection. The incident was caught on film and posted on YouTube. The fallen part was re-made and re-fitted and new platforms were built. The ride was covered in scaffolding for a week whilst being repaired. The ride re-opened shortly afterwards.

See also

External links

Rush at Total Thorpe Park
Rush at Thorpe Park Insider
Rush at Theme Park Junkies
Rush at ThemeParks-UK

References

Pendulum rides
Amusement rides manufactured by S&S – Sansei Technologies
Thorpe Park
Amusement rides introduced in 2005